The 2016 Austin Peay Governors football team represented Austin Peay State University during the 2016 NCAA Division I FCS football season. The Governors were led by first-year head coach Will Healy, played their home games at Fortera Stadium, and were members of the Ohio Valley Conference. They finished the season 0–11, 0–8 in OVC play to finish in last place. This was the third time in the last four seasons that the Governors went winless. They are 1–45 since 2013 and have lost 27 consecutive games. Their last win came against Murray State in 2014.

Schedule

Source: Schedule

Game summaries

at Troy

Tennessee Tech

at Eastern Illinois

Murray State

at Tennessee–Martin

at Jacksonville State

Mercer

at Southeast Missouri State

Tennessee State

Eastern Kentucky

at Kentucky

References

Austin Peay
Austin Peay Governors football seasons
College football winless seasons
Austin Peay Governors football